Book of the Dead: Friends of Yesteryear: Fictioneers & Others is a collection of memoirs by author E. Hoffmann Price. It was published in 2001 by Arkham House in an edition of approximately 4,000 copies. The book contains memoirs of several writers of the pulp magazine era. Also included are several appreciations of Price by other authors.

Contents
Book of the Dead contains the following:

 "Introduction", by Jack Williamson
 "Some Notes on EHP and the Book of the Dead", by Peter Ruber
 Friends of Yesteryear: Fictioneers & Others
 "Prologue"
 I "Farnsworth Wright"
 II "Otis Adelbert Kline"
 III "Howard Phillips Lovecraft"
 IV "Robert Ervin Howard"
 V "Clark Ashton Smith"
 VI "W. K. Mashburn, Jr."
 VII "Ralph Milne Farley (Roger Sherman Hoar)"
 VIII "Seabury Grandin Quinn"
 IX "Hugh Doak Rankin"
 X "The Varnished Vultures & Spider Bite"
 XI "Barsoom Badigian"
 XII "Harry Olmsted"
 XIII "Albert Richard Wetjen"
 XIV "Norbert W. Davis"
 XV "Milo Ray Phelps"
 XVI "William S. Bruner"
 XVII "Henry Kuttner"
 XVIII "August W. Derleth"
 XIX "Edmond Hamilton"
 "Epilogue"
 Other Memoirs
 "The Lovecraft Controversy: Why?", by E. Hoffmann Price
 "Five Million Words", by Monte Linsley
 "Seabury Quinn: An Appreciation", by E. Hoffmann Price
 "Mortonius", by E. Hoffmann Price (about James Ferdinand Morton, Jr.)
 "A Conversation With E. Hoffmann Price", by Gregorio Montjo
 "One Man’s View of the Death of the Pulp Era", by E. Hoffmann Price
 "EHP: A Bibliography", by Virgil Utter
 Index

References

2001 non-fiction books
Literary autobiographies